Miguel Ángel Navarro (born January 14, 1982 in Mar del Plata, Argentina) is a Bolivian swimmer, who specialized in sprint freestyle and butterfly events. Navarro represented Bolivia at the 2008 Summer Olympics in Beijing, where he swam the men's 100 m freestyle, He finished the race with a time of 56.96 seconds. Navarro, however, failed to advance into the semi-finals, as he placed sixty-third in the overall rankings.

References

External links
NBC Olympics Profile

Bolivian male freestyle swimmers
Living people
Olympic swimmers of Bolivia
Swimmers at the 2008 Summer Olympics
Sportspeople from Santa Cruz de la Sierra
1982 births
21st-century Bolivian people